Green Meadows is an unincorporated community and census-designated place (CDP) in Umatilla County, Oregon, United States. It was first listed as a CDP following the 2010 census.

It is on the east side of the valley of McKay Creek, a north-flowing tributary of the Umatilla River, which in turn is a west-flowing tributary of the Columbia.

Demographics

References 

Census-designated places in Umatilla County, Oregon
Census-designated places in Oregon